The 2011 New Mexico Bowl was a post-season American college football bowl game, held on December 17, 2011 at University Stadium on the campus of the University of New Mexico in Albuquerque, New Mexico as part of the 2011-12 NCAA Bowl season.

The game, which was telecast at 12 p.m. MT on ESPN, featured the Wyoming Cowboys from the Mountain West Conference versus the Temple Owls from the Mid-American Conference.

Temple made its first trip to the New Mexico Bowl, becoming the first team from the MAC to appear in the game. The Owls made just their fourth bowl appearance in school history, and their second in the last three years. Wyoming appeared in its second New Mexico Bowl. The Cowboys were 35–28 victors over Fresno State in the 2009 New Mexico Bowl.

The two schools have only previously played each other on one occasion.  Wyoming won the 1990 matchup in Laramie, Wyoming by a score of 38–23.

Temple controlled the game from start to finish in a 37-15 win. The Owls were led by running back Bernard Pierce who ran for 100 yards and two touchdowns. Temple's aggressive defense held Wyoming's spread offense to just 267 yards (127 passing).

Teams

Temple

The Owls were led by offensively RB Bernard Pierce (1,381 yds., 25 TDs), QB Chester Stewart (743 passing yds.) and TE Evan Rodriguez (427 receiving yds.); and defensively by LB Stephen Johnson (113 tackles, 2.0 sacks), DL Adrian Robinson (47 tackles, 6.0 sacks), and DB Justin Gildea (46 tackles, 3.0 sacks, 3 INT).

Wyoming

Making its 13th bowl game appearance, the Cowboys were led offensively by RB Alvester Alexander (678 rushing yds., 6 TDs), QB Brett Smith (385 att., 233 of 385 passes, 2,495 yards, 18 TDs), and WR Chris McNeill (504 receiving yds., 4 TDs); and defensively by SS Luke Ruff (97 tackles),DE Gabe Knapton (74 tackles, 6.5 sacks) and DB Blair Burns (48 tackles, 4 INT).

Game summary
Wyoming wore their home brown uniforms, and Temple wore white visitor uniforms. Temple sophomore quarterback Chris Coyer, the offensive MVP, threw for 169 yards and a touchdown and rushed for 71 yards. Defensive MVP, senior linebacker Tahir Whitehead, tallied 11 tackles including 1.5 for a loss.  Temple jumped out to a 37-7 lead behind a balanced offensive attack and out-gained Wyoming 424 yards to 267. Bernard Pierce ran for 100 yards and two touchdowns while backup Matt Brown added 49 yards and another score. Wide receiver Rod Streater caught a 61-yard touchdown at the end of the first half.

Scoring summary

Statistics

Game Notes
Temple's three interceptions tied a New Mexico Bowl record.
Temple won its first bowl game since 1979.
Wyoming's bowl W/L record dropped to 6-7
Bernard Pierce rushed for 1,481 yards and 27 TDs on the season
Brett Smith was the Mountain West Freshman of the Year

References

External links
 Box Score - ESPN

2011–12 NCAA football bowl games
2011
2011
2011
December 2011 sports events in the United States
2011 in sports in New Mexico